Dehak or Dehik or Dehek or Dihik or Dahak may refer to various places in Iran:
 Dehak, Bushehr
 Dehak, Arsanjan, Fars Province
 Dehak-e Aliabad, Arsanjan County, Fars Province
 Dehak, Shiraz, Fars Province
 Dehak, Isfahan
 Dehak, Mazandaran
 Dehik, North Khorasan
 Dehak, Qazvin
 Dehak, Sistan and Baluchestan
 Dehak, South Khorasan
 Dehik, South Khorasan
 Dehak, Tehran

See also
 Dahak (disambiguation)